Bank Indonesia (BI) is the central bank of the Republic of Indonesia. It replaced in 1953 the Bank of Java (DJB), which had been created in 1828 to serve the financial needs of the Dutch East Indies.

History

Bank of Java

King William I of the Netherlands granted the right to create a private bank in the Indies in 1826, which was named . It was founded on 24 January 1828 and later became the bank of issue of the Dutch East Indies. The bank regulated and issued the Netherlands Indies gulden.

In 1881, an office of the Bank of Java was opened in Amsterdam. Later followed the opening of an office in New York. By 1930 the bank owned sixteen office branches in the Dutch East Indies: Bandung, Cirebon, Semarang, Yogyakarta, Surakarta, Surabaya, Malang, Kediri, Banda Aceh, Medan, Padang, Palembang, Banjarmasin, Pontianak, Makassar, and Manado.

The Bank of Java was operated as a private bank and individuals as well as industries etc. could get help in the bank's offices.

Bank Indonesia

Bank Indonesia was founded on 1 July 1953 from the nationalisation of De Javasche Bank, three years after the recognition of Indonesia's independence by Netherlands.

For the next 15 years, Bank Indonesia carried on commercial activities as well as acting as the nation's national bank and is in charge in issuing Indonesian rupiah currency. This came to an end with the Act No. 13 of 1968 on the Central Bank, transforming Bank Indonesia as a central bank.

The act was subsequently replaced by Act No. 23 of 1999, giving the bank independence from governmental control. Thereafter, the bank reported to the parliament (DPR) instead of the President, and the bank's governor was no longer a member of the cabinet.

Organization
The bank is led by the board of governors, comprising the governor, a senior deputy governor and at between four and seven deputy governors.

The governor and deputy governors serve a five-year term, and are eligible for re-election for a maximum of two terms. The governor and senior deputy governor are nominated and appointed by the president, with approval from the DPR. Deputy governors are nominated by the governor and appointed by the president, with approval of the DPR. The president has no power to dismiss a member of the board, except when a board member voluntarily resigns, is permanently disabled, or is proven guilty of criminal offence. The senior deputy governor acts as governor in the case of the latter's office vacancy.

The Board of Governors Meeting is the bank's highest decision-making forum. It is held at least once a month to decide on general policy on monetary affairs, and at least once a week to evaluate policy implementation or to decide on other strategic and principle policy.

The Bank is active in promoting financial inclusion policy and is a leading member of the Alliance for Financial Inclusion. It hosted AFI's second annual Global Policy Forum (GPF)  in Bali, Indonesia in 2010. On 14 May 2012 Bank Indonesia announced it would be making specific commitments to financial inclusion under the Maya Declaration.

By 30 December 2013, the bank's microprudential supervision functions will be transferred to Financial Services Authority (OJK). In the future, the bank will maintain Indonesian financial system and monetary stability through mixture of monetary and macroprudential instruments and policies. The Financial Services Authority institutive law (law n° 21 of 2011 enacted on 31 December 2012) followed the US$710 million baylout of Bank Century and the receivership 21 other national private banks.

Strategic objectives
The Bank describes its strategic objectives as being
:
 Maintain monetary stability
 Maintain the financial sustainability of the Bank of Indonesia
 Strengthen the effectiveness of monetary management
 Create a sound and effective banking system and financial system stability
 Maintain the security and effectiveness of the payment system
 Increase the effectiveness of Good Governance implementation
 Strengthen the organisation and build highly competent human resources with the support of a knowledge-based work culture
 Integrate the Bank of Indonesia's transformation in line with Bank Indonesia's destination statement of 2008

National Payment Gateway
The aim is to integrate all Automated Teller Machines in ASEAN countries, beginning with integration first in each country. On 16 January 2012 interconnection between Bank Mandiri ATMs and Bank Central Asia ATMs (Prima ATMs) was launched.

Bank Indonesia Liquidity Support
Bank Indonesia Liquidity Support is an Indonesian government policy that was formulated with Bank Indonesia in the crisis period and executed by Bank Indonesia to rescue the monetary and banking system as well as the economy as a whole. It was partly based on the instruction and command of the President in the limited meeting of economic, finance, and development supervision and production and distribution on 3 September 1997.

This policy was provided under various emergency lending schemes (Fasilitas Diskonto I/Fasdis I, Fasdis II, Fasilitas SBPU, Fasilitas SBPUK, Fasilitas Diskonto Baru and Dana Talangan).

Offices
BI operates 37 offices across Indonesia, and five representative offices in New York City, London, Tokyo, Singapore and Beijing. In addition, Bank Indonesia also operates a well-appointed museum (Museum Bank Indonesia) which is housed in the former De Javasche Bank head office building in old Jakarta (Kota).

Indonesian offices
Bank Indonesia have branches in almost all major cities of Indonesia.

Worldwide representative offices
  Singapore: 160 Robinson Road #28-05, SBF Center Singapore 068914.
  London: 10 City Road, London EC 1Y 2EH.
  Tokyo: New Kokusai Building Room 906 No.4 - 1, Marunouchi 3 - Chome Chiyoda-ku, Tokyo, 100-0005 Japan.
  New York: One Liberty Plaza 165 Broadway, 31st floor New York N.Y. 10006.
  Beijing: Fortune Financial Center Building Lt. 46, 5 Dongsanhuan Road, Chaoyang District, Beijing 100020

List of governors

Bibliography

 J. Soedradjad Djiwandono. 2005. Bank Indonesia and the Crisis: An Insider's View. Singapore: Institute of Southeast Asian Studies. 
 Miranda S. Goeltom. 2008. Essays in Macroeconomic Policy: The Indonesian Experience.  Jakarta: PT. Gramedia Pustaka Utama.

See also

 Economy of Indonesia
 Indonesian rupiah
 List of banks in Indonesia
 Payment system
 Real-time gross settlement
 Netherlands Trading Company
 Nederlandsch-Indische Handelsbank

References

External links
 Bank Indonesia official website

Banks of Indonesia
Indonesia
Banks established in 1953
Financial regulatory authorities of Indonesia
Indonesian companies established in 1953